The Duja Tower is a  mixed-use skyscraper in Dubai, United Arab Emirates. It has 53 floors. The building was designed by ZAS Architects and National Engineering Bureau, while the structural design was designed by Port Saeed Engineering. In addition, it was developed by Nasser Lootah Real Estate. Construction of the tower started in 2009 and completed in 2017.

On the evening of 20 February 2020, a fire broke out on the upper parts of the building's claddings. In response, the residents were evacuated and sheltered to the nearby buildings. The National reported that the claddings were similar to that of Grenfell Tower fire. No injuries were reported. On 22 February 2020, the residents were permitted to return to the building.

See also 
 List of tallest buildings in Dubai

References

External links
 Official website

Residential skyscrapers in Dubai
Buildings and structures in Dubai
Skyscraper office buildings in Dubai